Leptophis diplotropis, commonly known as the Pacific Coast parrot snake, is a species of snake in the family Colubridae. The species is endemic to Mexico.

Geographic range
The geographic range of L. diplotropis in Mexico extends from southwestern Chihuahua and southern Sonora to southeastern Oaxaca.

Subspecies
There are two recognized subspecies, including the nominate race.
Leptophis diplotropis diplotropis 
Leptophis diplotropis forreri 

Nota bene: A trinomial authority in parentheses indicates that the subspecies was originally described in a genus other than Leptophis.

Etymology
The subspecific name, forreri, is in honor of Alphonse Forrer (1836–1899), an English-born collecter of zoological specimens in Mexico for the British Museum.

Habitat
It is a highly adaptable species, which is also found in disturbed areas.

References

Further reading
Günther A (1872). "Seventh Account of new Species of Snakes in the Collection of the British Museum". Ann. Mag. Nat. Hist., Fourth Series 9: 13–37. ("Ahætulla diplotropis", new species, pp. 25–26 + Plate VI, figure A).
Smith HM (1943). "Summary of the Collections of snakes and crocodilians made in Mexico under the Walter Rathbone Bacon Traveling Scholarship". Proc. U.S. National Mus. 93 (3169): 393–504. ("Leptophis diplotropis forreri, new subspecies", p. 443).

Colubrids
Endemic reptiles of Mexico
Reptiles described in 1872
Taxa named by Albert Günther
Sonoran–Sinaloan transition subtropical dry forest
Sinaloan dry forests
Jalisco dry forests
Fauna of the Southern Pacific dry forests
Fauna of the Sierra Madre Occidental